Live from Mountain Stage was the first posthumous album release by Bronx-born musician Laura Nyro and her third officially released live album.

The short ten-song live album was recorded as part of the Mountain Stage radio series in late 1990 and features a fairly generic set list that Nyro stuck to for much of her later career. The songs are a mix of songs from her later career as well as some of her more familiar songs and soul medleys.

The album was released on the independent label Blue Plate to mixed reaction from fans and critics, but it paved the way for the following year's posthumous album of new material, Angel in the Dark.

Track listing
"Oh Yeah, Maybe Baby"
"My Innocence"
"To a Child"
"And When I Die"
"Let It Be Me / The Christmas Song" [medley]
"Roll of the Ocean"
"Lite a Flame (The Animal Rights Song)"
"Emmie"
"Japanese Restaurant"
"I'm So Proud / Dedicated to the One I Love" [medley]

References
Allmusic
Laura Nyro
Michele Kort's biography Soul Picnic: The Music and Passion of Laura Nyro

Laura Nyro live albums
Live albums published posthumously
2000 live albums